Sailly-Labourse is a commune in the Pas-de-Calais department in the Hauts-de-France region of France.

Geography

Population

Places of interest
 The church of St. Maurice, dating from the sixteenth century.
 The eighteenth-century chateau de Prés.
 The Commonwealth War Graves Commission cemetery.

See also
Communes of the Pas-de-Calais department

References

External links

 The CWGC cemetery
 The CWGC graves in the churchyard

Saillylabourse